Alf Brustellin (27 July 1940 – 11 November 1981) was an Austrian film director and screenwriter. He directed six films between 1972 and 1979. He co-directed the 1978 film Germany in Autumn, which won the Special Recognition Award at the 28th Berlin International Film Festival. Alf Brustellin worked together with Bernhard Sinkel as a director and screenwriter team.

Brustellin was in a relationship with Hannelore Elsner from 1973 until his death. He died in a car accident.

Selected filmography
Director
  (1975) (co-director: Bernhard Sinkel)
  (1977) (co-director: Bernhard Sinkel) — (based on a novel by )
 Germany in Autumn (anthology film, 1978)
  (1979) — (based on a novel by Martin Walser)
Cinematographer
 Lina Braake (1975)

References

External links

1940 births
1981 deaths
Austrian film directors
Austrian male screenwriters
Film people from Vienna
20th-century Austrian screenwriters
20th-century Austrian male writers